Kishnarekë (in Albanian) or Kishnareka is a village in the municipality of Drenas, in central Kosovo. The population in 2011 was 1504.

After 1999, the village was also known by the names Lumisht and Krujas.

External links 

 location

References 

Drenas